The following highways are numbered 255:

Canada
 Manitoba Provincial Road 255
 New Brunswick Route 255
 Nova Scotia Route 255
 Quebec Route 255
 Saskatchewan Highway 255

Costa Rica
 National Route 255

Japan
 Japan National Route 255

Korea, South
 Gangjin–Gwangju Expressway

United States
 Interstate 255
 Alabama State Route 255
 Arkansas Highway 255
 California State Route 255
 Florida State Road 255 (former)
 Georgia State Route 255
 Illinois Route 255
 K-255 (Kansas highway)
 Kentucky Route 255
 Maryland Route 255
 Montana Secondary Highway 255
 New Mexico State Road 255
 New York State Route 255 (former)
 Ohio State Route 255
 Oregon Route 255
 Pennsylvania Route 255
 Tennessee State Route 255
 Texas State Highway 255
 Utah State Route 255 (former)
 Virginia State Route 255
 Wyoming Highway 255